The 1912 Clemson Tigers football team represented Clemson Agricultural College—now known as Clemson University—as a member of the Southern Intercollegiate Athletic Association (SIAA) during the 1912 college football season. Led by Frank Dobson in his third and final season a head coach, the team compiled an overall record of 4–4 with a mark of 3–3 in SIAA team.  W. B. Britt was the team captain.

Schedule

References

Clemson
Clemson Tigers football seasons
Clemson Tigers football